Brett Swain is an Australian actor and comedian.

Television career 
Swain played Kim Timmins on the Australian soap opera Neighbours from 2005. He had previously appeared in Neighbours as John Swan, the duck hunter who killed Kerry Bishop in 1990 and in 1992 as builder Buzz Wade and 1993 as a horse racing commentator. At the time, he was the real life partner of former Neighbours actress Marcella Russo (who played Liljana Bishop). He also started in TV series Fergus McPhail. In 2008, Swain starred in Nine Network's Underbelly as Tibor Cassadae.

Film 
Swain's film credits include Mick Molloy's films Crackerjack (as the marijuana growing greenkeeper) and Bad Eggs (as Security Officer Bartlett). He played the main character Shaun's father in Mallboy (2001), and had a small role in Ghost Rider (2007) as a police officer. He also played the role of Kenny Yallop in 2003 Take Away

Stage roles 
On stage, Swain has played Riff Raff in the Melbourne production of The Rocky Horror Show at the Regent Theatre, and cricketer Terry Jenner in Shane Warne: The Musical.

References

External links

Australian male television actors
Australian male film actors
Year of birth missing (living people)
Living people